Spectamen laevior is a species of sea snail, a marine gastropod mollusk in the family Solariellidae.

Description
This species was originally considered a variety of Solariella mutabilis (now a synonym of Spectamen mutabilis) with the following different characteristics: the shell with the peripheral and infraperipheral keel quite or nearly smooth (in one instance also the upper keel); the sculpture of the umbilicus more conspicuous. The finer sculpture of the upper part of the whorls and of the base, varies also in some degree, this last one so much, that it is nearly but never quite smooth.

Distribution
This marine species occurs off Timor, Indonesia.

References

 Williams S.T., Smith L.M., Herbert D.G., Marshall B.A., Warén A., Kiel S., Dyal P., Linse K., Vilvens C. & Kano Y. (2013) Cenozoic climate change and diversification on the continental shelf and slope: evolution of gastropod diversity in the family Solariellidae (Trochoidea). Ecology and Evolution 3(4): 887–917

External links
 World Register of Marine Species

laevior
Gastropods described in 1908